(born 23 April 1984) is a Japanese former ski jumper.

Career
Yumoto made his World Cup debut in Sapporo in 2003, but did not become a regular member of the Japanese World Cup team until the 2007/08 season, where his best result was a 22nd-place finish at Sapporo. On 29 November 2008, at Kuusamo, Finland, Yumoto got his first Top 10 finish in a World Cup event, when he finished in 8th place. On 14 December 2008, he got his first career victory, when he won the event at Pragelato, Italy in heavy snow conditions.

World Cup

Standings

Wins

External links 

1984 births
Living people
Japanese male ski jumpers
Sportspeople from Nagano Prefecture